The Koroška Vrata District (literally "Carinthian Gates") is a city district of the City Municipality of Maribor in northeastern Slovenia. In 2014, the district had a population of 7,283. The Koroška Vrata District is home to many secondary schools, high schools and faculties. Ljudski Vrt Stadium, the central stadium in Maribor, is located there.

References

External links

Districts of the City Municipality of Maribor